Suleiman Al Abbas is a Syrian engineer and politician who was the minister of petroleum and mineral resources in the period 2013–2016.

Education
Abbas holds a bachelor's degree in petroleum engineering, which he received from the Romanian University of Ploieşti in 1982. He also obtained certificates in oil well control and contract arbitration from the Arab Engineers Federation.

Career
Abbas served as director of Al Jibseh oil fields in 1997. Then he was appointed director of planning department at the Syrian Petroleum Company in 2005. He became a board member of Al Furat Oil Company in 2008. He also served as deputy oil minister. On 9 February 2013, he was appointed minister of petroleum and mineral resources to the cabinet headed by Prime Minister Wael Al Halki in a minor cabinet reshuffle. Abbas replaced Saeed Hunedi as oil minister. His term ended in 2016.

Sanctions
Abbas has been in the list of financial sanctions imposed by the United Kingdom against Syria since 2014 due to his alleged role in the repression of the Syrians during the civil war.

References

Arab Socialist Ba'ath Party – Syria Region politicians
Living people
Syrian engineers
Oil and mineral reserves ministers of Syria
Year of birth missing (living people)
Syrian expatriates in Romania
Petroleum engineers
20th-century engineers